The Klutina River (Tl’atii Na’ in Ahtna) is a  tributary of the Copper River in the U.S. state of Alaska. Beginning at Klutina Glacier in the Chugach Mountains, the river flows generally northeast, passing through Klutina Lake, to meet the larger river at the community of Copper Center.

Fishing
Floatplanes and jet boats, trails, and an unimproved four-wheel-drive road between Copper Center and Klutina Lake provide additional access to game fish in the watershed. In addition to salmon, the main species are Dolly Varden and Arctic grayling.

See also
List of rivers of Alaska

References

Rivers of Alaska
Rivers of Copper River Census Area, Alaska
Rivers of Unorganized Borough, Alaska